Ollomont is a town and comune in the Aosta Valley region of north-west Italy.

Geography
Bagnes, Bionaz, Bourg-Saint-Pierre, Doues, Etroubles, Oyace, Valpelline are nearby towns.

Cities and towns in Aosta Valley